Maleo Airport is an airport located at Morowali, Central Sulawesi, Indonesia. The airport was inaugurated on May 27, 2018. The Airport has a land area of 158 hectares.

Airlines and destinations

External links
 Ditjen Perhubungan Udara
 www.siemorowali.com
 www.transsulawesi.com

References

Airports in Central Sulawesi